The Revolver M1882, also referred to by the name Model 1929, was a revolver produced in Switzerland by the Waffenfabrik Bern and which was used as an ordnance arm by the Swiss Army.

Design
It was designed by Colonel Rudolph Schmidt
The revolver was designed to use the black powder 7.5 millimeter round.  The 1882 was a simple and effective design.  Model 1882 with serial numbers under 20,000 were fitted with vulcanized rubber grips. Model with serial numbers over 20,000 had wood grips. Some were made by SIG.

The Model 1929 

The model 1929, or "M1882-29", is a more simplified version of the model 1882. Most changes were made to help ease production and to make it less expensive. One can distinguish a model 1929 by its round barrel from the 1882's octagonal one. Grip was widened to make it more ergonomical and higher quality steel was used. The upper frame was made more rigid and a firing pin instead of the older models one-piece hammer was used. Still, the weapon had no manual safety. The 1929 continued to use black powder cartridges in Swiss military service and was finally removed from service in the 1970s.

Notes

Revolvers of Switzerland
Military revolvers
Early revolvers
1882 introductions